Christel Borghi is a Swiss figure skater. She is the 1999 Swiss national champion. She placed 25th at the 1999 European Figure Skating Championships.

Borghi is an ISU Technical Specialist for Switzerland Among the competitions for which she has served as technical specialist are the 2008 ISU JGP Madrid Cup.

Results

References

Swiss female single skaters
Living people
International Skating Union technical specialists
Year of birth missing (living people)